Grodno Drugie  is a village in the administrative district of Gmina Nowe Ostrowy, within Kutno County, Łódź Voivodeship, in central Poland. The name literally translates as "Second Grodno".

The village has a population of 80.

References

Grodno Drugie